Lamae is a district (amphoe) in the southern part of Chumphon province, southern Thailand.

Geography
Neighboring districts are (from the south clockwise) Tha Chana of Surat Thani province, Phato and Lang Suan of Chumphon Province. To the east is the Gulf of Thailand.

History
The minor district (king amphoe) was created on 1 July 1971, when the three tambons, Lamae, Thung Luang, and Suan Taeng, were split off from Lang Suan district. It was upgraded to a full district on 12 April 1977.

Administration
The district is divided into four sub-districts (tambons), which are further subdivided into 47 villages (mubans). Lamae is a township (thesaban tambon) which covers parts of the same-named tambon. There are a further four tambon administrative organizations (TAO).

References

External links
amphoe.com

Districts of Chumphon province